Rustem Rinatovich Adagamov is a Russian blogger who goes by the pseudonym of "Drugoi" ("Другой"), meaning "Another". The Daily Telegraph has described Adagamov as "Russia's number one blogger".

In 2009 Kremlin's press department invited him to cover a meeting between Dmitry Medvedev and his visiting Indian counterpart Pratibha Patil.

References

External links
 
 
 

1961 births
Living people
Russian bloggers
Russian photographers
2011–2013 Russian protests